Adelheid Kofler née Schaschek (24 June 1889, Haugsdorf – 27 July 1985, Innsbruck) was an Austrian inventor, mineralogist, and ophthalmologist. She was an early Ph.D./M.D. graduate from the University of Vienna.

Biography
After attending the public school in Amstetten, Lower Austria, Adelheid Schaschek studied from 1903 to 1907 at the municipal girls' lyceum in Brno, Czech Republic, and from 1907 to 1911 at the University of Vienna. She passed in 1911 the teaching examination, qualifying her to teach mathematics, natural history, and physics to young female students at lyceums. In 1912, she passed the examination qualifying her to teach at teacher training institutions and at higher level schools for girls. She then taught at the girls' lyceum in the Viennese district of Mariahilf.

Under the direction of Friedrich Johann Karl Becke, she worked on her doctoral dissertation on mineralogy and in 1913 she received her Ph.D. from the University of Vienna. Beginning in 1917 she studied medicine at the same university, receiving her M.D. there in 1921, specializing in ophthalmology. 

In that same year, she married the pharmacologist Ludwig Kofler (1891–1951) in Vienna.

In 1925 Adelheid Kofler moved with her family to Innsbruck. From the early 1930s, she helped her husband in his research at University of Innsbruck's pharmacognostics institute. Using her knowledge of mineralogy, she conducted studies on the behavior of mixed crystals during melting and crystallization. Together with her husband, she developed the Kofler hot microscope (thermomicroscope) and the Kofler hot bench. Much of her research was focused on polymorphism, collaborating with fellow researcher, Maria Kuhnert-Brandstätter.

The research of the Koflers, conducted jointly, combined the academic strengths of both scientists.Ludwig next reported a method for determining refractive index using his hot stage: the unknown would be mixed with a few fragments of one of 23 different grades of glass; these vanished when the refractive index of glass and melt matched. Developing these ideas further, the Koflers devised a microscale version of the Rast molecular weight method, with camphor and the unknown together on the heated stage. Then Adelheid put two substances side-by-side on the stage and could both watch them melt separately and observe their interaction at the interface. This led to studies of co-crystals and eutectics. Photomicrographs illustrate these magnificent papers.The Koflers had a daughter Erika (1922–2012) and two sons, Helmut and Walter (b. 1928), who did research with his father in the late 1940s and early 1950s. Her husband committed suicide in 1951.

Awards and honors
 1954 — Fritz Pregl Prize awarded to Adelheid Kofler
 1980 — Österreichischen Ehrenkreuze für Wissenschaft und Kunst. 1st class

Selected publications
 (Microscopic investigations of the ergot alkaloids I. Ergotamine and Ergotamine)

 (Polymorphism of organic substances: acridine, catechol, diphenylamine and suberic acid)

 (Micro-Methods for the Identification of Organic Substances and Mixtures of Substances; 1st edition, 1945; 2nd edition, 1948)

References

1889 births
1985 deaths
University of Vienna alumni
Austrian mineralogists
Austrian chemists
20th-century Austrian inventors
Austrian women scientists
20th-century Austrian scientists
20th-century women scientists